Clusium (Klýsion, or , Kloúsion; Umbrian:Camars) was an ancient city in Italy, one of several found at the site. The current municipality of Chiusi (Tuscany) partly overlaps this Roman walled city. The Roman city remodeled an earlier Etruscan city, Clevsin, found in the territory of a prehistoric culture, possibly also Etruscan or proto-Etruscan. The site is located in northern central Italy on the west side of the Apennines.

Location
Chiusi is situated on a hill above the valley of the Clanis river near lake Clusium, both of which features had those names in antiquity. The Clanis is part of the Tiber drainage system and was navigable by boat from there. Rome was also accessed by the via Cassia, which was built over an Etruscan road.

Etruscan history
By the time it appears in Livy's History, it is already a major Etruscan city being petitioned for assistance against the republican partisans of ancient Rome. About its life prior to that time, Livy only makes a brief statement that it was once called Camars.

Different theories exist of the city's origin. Villanovan pottery has been found at Chiusi. One common type is a cinerary urn dating to the 8th century BC. These urns are in the shape of wattle-and-daub huts with thatched roofs, presumably the homes of the deceased. This style of architecture is so different from classical Etruscan that many Etruscologists have denied a continuity. On the other hand, it is clear that the people of the region received a strong impetus from Greek colonies such as Cumae and from Greek immigration.

The minority theory is currently the Proto-Italic. In this theory, Etruscans from the coast or from the Aegean resettled and renamed an Umbrian city called Camars, which the exponents believe means "marshland" in Italic. On enclosing the city with a wall they changed the name to "enclosure", using an Etruscanized form, Clevsin, of the perfect passive participle, clusus, of Latin cludere, "to close".

Clevsin and Camars are more comfortable in their Etruscan milieu as Etruscan words. The limited known Etruscan vocabulary includes camthi, the name of a magistracy, which might be segmented cam-thi, where –thi is a known locative ending. Ar, -arasi, -aras are plural endings of different cases. A cleva is an offering. S and -isi are genitive and dative endings. A place of magistracies or offerings is entirely harmonious with Etruscan culture and the uses of a regional capital city. The final resolution of the question waits for more evidence.

It is believed that Clusium joined the Etruscan League of twelve cities in the 600s BC, to defend against the Roman king Tarquinius Priscus.

Lars Porsena was king of Clusium in 508 BC. Lucius Tarquinius Superbus, formerly king of Rome, had been expelled along with his family from Rome in 509 BC. He had sought to regain the throne, firstly by the Tarquinian conspiracy and secondly by force of arms. Both attempts had been unsuccessful, the conspiracy having been discovered, and Tarquin's army having been defeated at the Battle of Silva Arsia.

Tarquin convinced Lars Porsena to lead his army against Rome. The war between Clusium and Rome followed, during which Porsena besieged Rome. The siege and the war ended with a peace treaty, by which Porsena received hostages from Rome and returned to Veii lands that had previously been taken by Rome. In 507 BC Rome's hostages and lands were restored, and peace between Rome and Porsena was cemented. Tarquinius was not restored to the Roman throne.

In 508 BC, after the siege of Rome, Porsena split his forces and sent part of the Clusian army with his son Aruns to besiege the Latin city of Aricia. The Clusians besieged Aricia; however the Aricians sent for assistance from the Latin League and from Cumae, and the Clusian army was defeated in battle.

Pliny the Elder wrote that a magnificent tomb was built for Porsena; a large mausoleum surrounded by cascades of pyramids over a labyrinth of underground chambers in which an intruder could get lost. Pliny never saw this tomb, so his description was based on a report from Varro and perhaps a conflated comparison to the Minoan labyrinths he describes before this tomb. Large-size tumuli of the late archaic period were built at Chiusi, and modern scholars have tried to associate these (especially Poggio Gaiella) with the legendary tomb of Porsena.

In the early 4th century BC (391 BC according to Varronian chronology) it was besieged by Gauls, and the Clusines called upon Rome to intermediate. However, in the following negotiations, one of the Roman delegates, of the gens Fabia, killed a Gallic leader. When the Romans refused to hand over the Fabii and in fact appointed two members of the family as consuls for the next year, the enraged Gauls broke up their siege and under the leadership of Brennus they marched onto and subsequently sacked Rome.

Roman history
At the time of the invasion of the Gauls in 391 BC, Clusium was on friendly terms with Rome. It was once thought that it was the action of the Roman envoys who had come to intercede for the people of Clusium with the Gauls, and then, contrary to international law, took part in the battle which followed, which determined the Gauls to march on Rome; whether this was true or not, the Gauls needed no real provocation. Near Clusium too, according to Livy, a battle occurred in 296 BC between the Gauls and Samnites combined, and the Romans; a little later the united forces of Clusium and Perusia were defeated by the Romans. The precise period at which Clusium came under Roman supremacy is, however, uncertain, though this must have happened before 225 BC, when the Gauls advanced as far as Clusium. In 205 BC duing the Second Punic War it was reported that they promised ship timber and corn to Scipio Africanus.

The Via Cassia, constructed after 187 BC, passed just below the town. In Sulla's civil war, Papirius Carbo took up his position here, and two battles occurred in the neighbourhood. Sulla appears to have increased the number of colonists, and a statue was certainly erected in his honour here. In imperial times we hear little of it, though its grain and grapes were famous. Christianity found its way into Clusium as early as the 3rd century, and the tombstone of a bishop of AD 322 exists. In 540 it was named as a strong place to which the Ostrogothic king Vitiges sent a garrison of a thousand men.

Archaeology
The site of ancient Clusium was reoccupied in Roman and later times, obscuring and obliterating much of the Etruscan layers. For example, the ancient sources describe the tomb of Lars Porsena at Clusium as well as the sacking and levelling of the city by Sulla. Much of what remains are its tombs and its underground passages, some of which might have been associated with the monument to Porsena.

The following description from the early 20th century shows that excavation of the ancient site had by then been extensive. Of pre-Roman or Roman buildings in the town itself there are few remains, except for some fragments of the Etruscan town walls composed of rather small rectangular blocks of travertine, built into the medieval fortifications. Under it, however, extends an elaborate system of rock-cut passages, probably drains. The chief interest of the place lies in its extensive necropolis, which surrounds the city on all sides. The earliest tombs (shaft tombs) precede Greek importation. There are no , and the next stage is marked by the so-called , in which the cinerary urn (often with a human head) is placed in a large clay jar. Other noteworthy tombs are those of the Granduca, with a single subterranean chamber carefully constructed in travertine, and containing eight sarcophagi of the same material; of Vigna Grande, very similar to this; of Colle Casuccini (the ancient stone door of which is still in working order), with two chambers, containing paintings representing funeral rites; of Poggio Moro and Valdacqua, in the former of which the paintings are almost destroyed, while the latter is now inaccessible.

A conception of the size of the whole necropolis may be gathered from the fact that nearly three thousand Etruscan inscriptions have come to light from Clusium and its district alone, while the part of Etruria north of it as far as the Arno has produced barely five hundred. Among the later tombs bilingual inscriptions are by no means rare, and both Etruscan and Latin inscriptions are often found in the same cemeteries, showing that the use of the Etruscan language only died out gradually. A large number of the inscriptions are painted upon the tiles which closed the niches containing the cinerary urns. The urns themselves are small, often of terracotta, originally painted, though the majority of them have lost their colour, and rectangular in shape. In Roman times the territory of Clusium seems to have extended as far as Lake Trasimeno.

Two Christian catacombs were found near Clusium, one in the hill of Santa Caterina near the railway station, the inscriptions of which seem to go back to the 3rd century, another 1 mile to the east in a hill on which a church and monastery of St Mustiola stood, which goes back to the 4th century, including among its inscriptions one bearing the date 303, and the tombstone of L. Petronius Dexter, bishop of Clusium, who died in 322. The total number of Etruscan inscriptions known in Clusium is nearly 3,000.

In 2004 Professor of Urban Restoration Giuseppe Centauro suggested that the traditional location of Clusium at Chiusi is wrong and that it is near Florence. As of 2008 he was trying to raise money and get permission to excavate.

See also 
 Tomb of Lars Porsena

References

External links 
Livius.org: Clusium (Chiusi)

Etruscan cities
Battles involving the Gauls
Former populated places in Italy
Villanovan culture
Chiusi

la:Clusium